Peter Christian Foersom   (28 January 1769 – 7 August 1856) was a Danish organist and composer. He was an organist at St. Knuds Church from 1790 to 1856.

See also
List of Danish composers

References
This article was initially translated from the Danish Wikipedia.

Danish composers
Male composers
Danish classical organists
Male classical organists
1769 births
1856 deaths